Dans Et (Dance!) is the fifth studio album by the Turkish pop singer Demet Akalın, released on 1 March 2008 in Turkey by Seyhan Müzik. The album was later released in Azerbaijan, Syria, Romania, Bulgaria and other East European countries. The album sold approximately 128,000 copies in Turkey alone.

Track listing

Charts

Sales

References

2008 albums
Demet Akalın albums